The 2018–19 Missouri State Bears basketball team represented Missouri State University during the 2018–19 NCAA Division I men's basketball season. The Bears, led by first-year head coach Dana Ford, played their home games at JQH Arena in Springfield, Missouri as members of the Missouri Valley Conference. They finished the season 16–16, 10–8 in MVC play to finish in a tie for third place. As the No. 4 seed in the MVC tournament, they lost in the quarterfinals to Bradley.

Previous season 
The Bears finished the 2017–18 season 18–15, 7–11 in MVC play to finish in a three-way tie for seventh place. As the No. 7 seed in the MVC tournament, they beat Valparaiso in the first round before losing to Southern Illinois in the quarterfinals.

On March 3, 2018, the school announced that head coach Paul Lusk had been fired. He finished at Missouri State with a seven-year record of 106–121. The school announced that former Tennessee State head coach Dana Ford had been named head coach of the Bears on March 21.

Offseason

Departures

Incoming transfers

2018 recruiting class

2019 recruiting class

Roster

Schedule and results

|-
!colspan=9 style=| Exhibition

|-
!colspan=9 style=| Non-conference regular season

|-
!colspan=9 style=| Missouri Valley regular season

|-
!colspan=9 style=| Missouri Valley tournament

Source

References

Missouri State Bears basketball seasons
Missouri State
Missouri State, basketball men
Missouri State, basketball men